Buluca is a village in the Yapraklı District of Çankırı Province in Turkey. Its population is 50 (2021).

References

Villages in Yapraklı District